Bernhard Berthelsen (16 March 1897  – 25 August 1964) was a Norwegian politician for the Liberal Party.

Berthelsen was born in Sør-Audnedal.  He was elected to the Norwegian Parliament from the Market towns of Telemark and Aust-Agder counties in 1945, and was re-elected on one occasion.

Berthelsen was a deputy member of the executive committee of Arendal city council from 1934 to 1940. He then sat as a regular city council member in the periods 1940–1944 and 1945–1946. He was later a member of Bergen city council during the term 1955–1959.

References

1897 births
1964 deaths
Liberal Party (Norway) politicians
Members of the Storting
20th-century Norwegian politicians